Maylis de Kerangal (born 16 June 1967) is a French author. Her novels deeply explore people in their work lives. She has won several awards for her work, and her novels have been published in several languages. Two have been adapted as films.

Life and career 
Raised in Le Havre, Maylis de Kerangal studied history and philosophy in Rouen and Paris. She worked at Paris-based Éditions Gallimard in the children and youth department from 1991 to 1996, then travelled in the United States. After her return, she did graduate work at the School for Advanced Studies in the Social Sciences.

De Kerangal wrote her first novel in 2000, and then became a full-time writer. Her celebrated novel, Birth of a Bridge (Naissance d'un pont, 2010) presents a literary saga of a handful of men and women who are charged with building a bridge somewhere in a mythical California. Birth of a Bridge was short-listed for the Prix Goncourt. It was awarded both the Prix Médicis in 2010 and the Premio Gregor von Rezzori in 2014, and has been translated into several languages worldwide.

Mend the Living (Réparer les vivants, 2014), translated by Jessica Moore and published in the UK, won the Prix Orange du Livre and the Grand prix RTL du livre in France, and the 2017 Wellcome Book Prize (UK). 

Mend the Living was adapted for the stage and produced at the theatre festival in Avignon. It received positive reviews for its intimate look at the realities and philosophical questioning around organ donation. It was adapted as the film Heal the Living (2016). A second English-language translation of the novel, entitled The Heartand translated by Sam Taylor, was published in the US in 2016.

Works

Novels 
Je marche sous un ciel de traîne. Paris: Éditions Verticales, 2000. 
La Vie voyageuse. Paris, Éditions Verticales, 2003. 
Ni fleurs ni couronnes. Paris: Éditions Verticales, 2006. 
Dans les rapides. Paris: Éditions Naïve, 2007. 
Corniche Kennedy. Paris: Éditions Verticales, 2008. 
Naissance d'un pont. Paris: Éditions Verticales, 2010.  
Awards: Prix Médicis 2010; Prix Franz Hessel 2010; Premio Gregor von Rezzori 2014
Translation: Birth of a Bridge. tr. Jessica Moore. Vancouver, BC: Talonbooks, 2014. 
Tangente vers l'est. Paris, Éditions Verticales, 2012, 134 p.  
Award: Prix Landerneau 2012
Translation: Eastbound. tr. Jessica Moore. New York: Archipelago Books, 2023.
Réparer les vivants. Paris: Éditions Verticales, 2013.  
Awards: Grand prix RTL-Lire 2014; Prix France Culture/Télérama 2014; Prix Orange du Livre 2014.
Translations: 
Mend the Living. tr. Jessica Moore. UK: Maclehose and Vancouver: Talonbooks, 2016. 
Award; Winner of the Wellcome Book Prize, 2017
The Heart. tr. Sam Taylor. New York: Farrar, Straus and Giroux, 2016. 
à ce stade de la nuit. Paris: Éditions Verticales, 2014. 
Un chemin de tables. Seuil - Raconter la vie. 2016. 
Translation: The Cook: A Novel. tr. Sam Taylor. New York: Farrar, Straus and Giroux, 2019. 
Un monde à portée de main,. Paris: Éditions Verticales, 2018.
Translation: Painting Time. tr. Jessica  Moore (2021)

References

External links

Maylis de Kerangal by Jessica Moore, Bomb

21st-century French novelists
French women novelists
1967 births
Writers from Toulon
Living people
21st-century French women writers
Officiers of the Ordre des Arts et des Lettres
Prix Médicis winners
Wellcome Book Prize